Fairview Creek is a  tributary of the Columbia Slough in the U.S. state of Oregon.

The creek is a former tributary of the Columbia River, which it reached by flowing north through wetlands in the Columbia's floodplain. In the early 20th century, an artificial channel diverted the water from these wetlands to the Columbia Slough, a tributary of the Willamette River. In 1960, water managers built a dam to create Fairview Lake for water storage and recreation. Fairview Creek has two named tributaries, No Name Creek, and Clear Creek. A smaller stream, Osburn Creek, also flows into Fairview Lake, which empties through a weir and culvert system on the west side of the lake into the upper slough.

In 2002, the City of Gresham adopted a plan for a  hiking and biking trail to run partly along the creek. The trail was designed to provide a north-south connection between the Springwater Corridor Trail along Johnson Creek to the south and the 40-Mile Loop trail along the Columbia River. As of 2008, a  segment of the trail between Northeast Halsey Street and Northeast Burnside Road was open to the public. Unfinished segments between Northeast Halsey and the Springwater Corridor are expected to be ready by autumn 2009. If so, at that point  of the trail will be open to the public.

See also 
 List of lakes in Oregon
 List of rivers of Oregon

Works cited
Bureau of Environmental Services (BES) (2005). Columbia Slough: Current Characterization Documents, "Chapter 5, Streamflow and Hydrology Characterization" (pdf). Portland, Oregon: City of Portland. Retrieved on 2008-12-14.

References

External links
 Interlachen Home Owners Association
 Oregon Lakes Association: Fairview Lake

Tributaries of the Willamette River
Geography of Portland, Oregon
Reservoirs in Oregon
Rivers of Oregon
Rivers of Multnomah County, Oregon